The 2019 Virginia municipal elections were held on November 5, 2019 to elect members of the County Board of Supervisors, Soil and Water Directors, and City School Board members.

County Board of Supervisors 
All 95 counties in Virginia in Virginia had at least one Board of Supervisor member up for election or reelection in 2019.

Soil and Water Directors 
Ninety-four of the 95 counties in Virginia (Arlington County being the exception) elected Soil and Water Directors in 2019.

Town Council 
Twelve of Virginia's 190 towns had town council elections in 2019.

City School Board 
Three of Virginia's 38 cities elected school board members in 2019. These cities are Buena Vista, Charlottesville, and Falls Church.

County School Board 
All 95 counties in Virginia elected board members in 2019.

Special elections 
At least 53 special elections in Virginia's municipalities were held in 2019.

References

External links